Danny Reuther (born 22 June 1988 in Eisenberg) is a German footballer who plays for BSG Chemie Kahla.

Career
Reuther, who began his career in his hometown by SV Eintracht Eisenberg, joined the youth from FC Carl Zeiss Jena in 2003. In the season 2008/2009, he was promoted to the first team, where he had his debut on 23 August 2008 against Kickers Emden. In January 2009, he was cut from the first squad and moved to the reserve team. He then signed with ZFC Meuselwitz on 9 July 2009. After only a half year with ZFC Meuselwitz, he returned to Jena and signed for SV Schott Jena. After the relegation of SV Schott Jena in the Thüringer Verbandsliga, he joined SV Eintracht Eisenberg on 28 June 2010.

References

1988 births
Living people
German footballers
FC Carl Zeiss Jena players
3. Liga players
Association football midfielders